Danyil Boldyrev (born May 15, 1992, in Donetsk, Ukraine) is a Ukrainian speed climber. He is World champion, multiple World and European Championships medalist and 2017 World Games silver medalist. He was also World Speed Climbing Record holder.

See also
List of grade milestones in rock climbing
History of rock climbing
Rankings of most career IFSC gold medals

References 

1992 births
Sportspeople from Donetsk
Ukrainian rock climbers
Living people
World Games silver medalists
Competitors at the 2013 World Games
Competitors at the 2017 World Games
Competitors at the 2022 World Games
20th-century Ukrainian people
21st-century Ukrainian people
IFSC Climbing World Championships medalists
IFSC Climbing World Cup overall medalists
Speed climbers